The League of the Right of the Republic (LPR) was a short-lived Polish political alliance between the national conservative Christian right League of Polish Families (LPR), the conservative-libertarian Real Politics Union and the conservative Right of the Republic on 10 September 2007, in the run-up to the 2007 parliamentary election. The merger was decided when it became apparent that the merger between the League of Polish Families and the Self-Defense of the Polish Republic would not take place. The coalition disbanded however very quickly after the elections.

Well-known politicians
Marek Jurek, former Sejm's Speaker (Right of the Republic)
Roman Giertych, former Minister of Education (League of Polish Families)
Janusz Korwin-Mikke, (Real Politics Union)

2007 establishments in Poland
Conservative parties in Poland
Catholic political parties
Defunct political party alliances in Poland
Nationalist parties in Poland
National Democracy
Political parties established in 2007
Political parties with year of disestablishment missing